Sarafloxacin (INN) is a quinolone antibiotic drug, which was removed from clinical use by its manufacturer Abbott Laboratories from April 30, 2001.

See also 
 Quinolone
 Adverse effects of fluoroquinolones

References 

Fluoroquinolone antibiotics
1,4-di-hydro-7-(1-piperazinyl)-4-oxo-3-quinolinecarboxylic acids